Alyssa Gialamas (born 5 December 1995) is an American Paralympic swimmer who competes in backstroke and freestyle swimming events in international level events.

References

1995 births
Living people
Sportspeople from Baltimore
Sportspeople from Cranston, Rhode Island
Paralympic swimmers of the United States
Swimmers at the 2012 Summer Paralympics
Swimmers at the 2016 Summer Paralympics
Medalists at the World Para Swimming Championships
Medalists at the 2011 Parapan American Games
Medalists at the 2019 Parapan American Games
American female freestyle swimmers
American female backstroke swimmers
Loyola University Maryland alumni
S5-classified Paralympic swimmers